An annual conference is a regional decision-making body within various Methodist denominations. Conferences are a key characteristic of the connectional system of government in Methodism. Annual conferences are composed primarily of the clergy members and a lay member or members from each charge (a charge is one or more churches served by a minister under appointment by the bishop). Each conference is a geographical division. In general, the smaller states in the United States hold one conference each, while larger states often include two or more conferences. Several annual conferences are held in other nations as well.

Allegheny Wesleyan Methodist Church
With regard to the membership of Annual Conferences of the Allegheny Wesleyan Methodist Connection, the 2014 Book of Discipline states:

Evangelical Wesleyan Church
In the Evangelical Wesleyan Church, two annual conferences exist, the Eastern Annual Conference and the Western Annual Conference. It is presided over by a bishop. Annual Conferences in the EWC are invested with the responsibility of reviewing candidates for holy orders.

Free Methodist Church
¶200 of The Book of Discipline of the Free Methodist Church states that:

United Methodist Church

Role and composition
The annual conference is the primary unit of denominational government. Regional groups of conferences within the United States make up the Jurisdictional Conferences, and outside the United States they make up the Central Conferences. The entire group of all annual conferences makes up the General Conference which meets every four years. Only the General Conference can speak officially for the church.

The annual conference is composed of an equal number of clergy and laity.  Each charge conference elects as many lay members to the annual conference as they have ministers appointed to that charge. In most cases that is one. The Lay Member must, at the time of election, be a professing member of the United Methodist Church for at least two years and four years an active participant in the church.  This requirement may be waived for those under 30 years old in the Central Conferences, and is waived for newly organized churches. The annual conference also consists of a number of "at-large" members, also known as "additional lay members," the number of at-large members being the number necessary (after the members elected by charge conferences are seated) so that the laity and the clergy are equal in number. First seated among at-large members are lay persons holding certain lay positions or offices designated by the Book of Discipline or by the annual conference itself. Among those officers are the lay leaders of the conference and each of the districts within the conference, as well as the Conference presidents of the United Methodist Men, United Methodist Women, the young adult organization, the college student organization and the youth fellowship. Also all the diaconal ministers, home missioners and the deaconesses under Episcopal appointment are lay members.  When there are multiple congregations in a charge conference, members from each congregation in that charge are encouraged to become at-large members.  After all lay members who hold their seat by virtue of office or position are seated and if additional lay members are needed the annual conference will elect any active United Methodist lay person who is interested in holding that position.

Among their other duties the annual conference elects delegates to the general, jurisdictional and central conferences, and votes on amendments to the church constitution.  Its executive committee, composed of its ordained clergy members, authorizes the ordination of clergy, also disciplines and hold accountable its members.

List of annual conferences

The following is a list of the annual conferences of the United Methodist Church (including the current Resident Bishops in each Episcopal Areas).

Annual conferences in the jurisdictional conferences (inside the U.S.)
The conferences are also grouped into jurisdictions that appoint bishops for conferences within that jurisdiction. These jurisdictions are listed 
as follows:
 North Central Jurisdiction
 Northeastern Jurisdiction
 South Central Jurisdiction
 Southeastern Jurisdiction
 Western Jurisdiction

North Central Jurisdiction
The North Central Jurisdiction consists of the following annual conferences:
 Dakotas Conference - Bishop Bruce R. Ough  
 Minnesota Conference - Bishop Bruce R. Ough  
 East Ohio Conference - Bishop Tracy S. Malone 
 Indiana Conference - Bishop Julius C. Trimble 
 Northern Illinois Conference - Bishop Sally Dyck (Chicago) 
 Illinois Great Rivers Conference  - Bishop Frank Beard (Illinois)
 Iowa Conference - Bishop Laurie Haller (Iowa) 
 West Ohio Conference - Bishop Gregory V. Palmer  
 Wisconsin Conference - Bishop Hee-Soo Jung  
 Michigan Area Conference - Bishop David Alan Bard

Northeastern Jurisdiction
The Northeastern Jurisdiction consists of the following annual conferences:
 Baltimore-Washington Conference - Bishop Latrelle Easterling (Washington) 
 Susquehanna Conference - Bishop Jeremiah Park (Harrisburg) 
 Eastern Pennsylvania Conference - Bishop Peggy Johnson (Philadelphia) www.epaumc.org

Greater New Jersey Conference. This conference serves approximately 560 congregations in New Jersey and parts of New York, and Pennsylvania. The conference's administrative offices and the office of the bishop are located in Neptune, New Jersey. GNJ is part of the Northeastern Jurisdictional Conference and is one of 57 annual conferences in the United States and 76 additional annual conferences internationally. The resident bishop is John R. Schol. Website: United Methodists of Greater New Jersey
 New England Annual Conference - Bishop Sudarshana Devadhar (Boston Area) 
 New York Annual Conference (NYAC) - Bishop Thomas Bickerton (New York) 
 Upper New York Annual Conference - Bishop Mark Webb 
 Peninsula-Delaware Conference - Bishop Peggy Johnson 
 West Virginia Annual Conference - Bishop Sandra Steiner Ball 
 Western Pennsylvania Annual Conference - Bishop Cynthia Moore-Koikoi (Pittsburgh)

Southeastern Jurisdiction 
According to its website,  
The Southeastern Jurisdiction consists of the following annual conferences:
 Alabama-West Florida Annual Conference – Bishop David Graves (Montgomery) also Bishop of the South Georgia Conference.
 Central Appalachian Missionary Conference – Bishop Leonard Fairley (Big Creek, KY) 
 Florida Annual Conference – Bishop Tom Berlin (Lakeland)  
 Holston Conference – Bishop Debra Wallace-Padgett (Knoxville)  
 Kentucky Conference (KAC), based in Crestwood, Kentucky, Bishop Leonard Fairley (Louisville) also Bishop of the Central Appalachian Missionary Conference.
 Mississippi Annual Conference – Bishop Sharma D. Lewis (Jackson)
 North Alabama Conference – Bishop Debra Wallace-Padgett (Birmingham)  also Bishop of the Holston Conference.
 North Carolina Conference – Bishop Connie Mitchell Shelton (Raleigh)  
 North Georgia Conference – Bishop Robin Dease (Atlanta)  
 South Carolina Conference – Bishop L. Jonathan Holston (Columbia) 
 South Georgia Conference – Bishop David Graves (Macon)
 Tennessee-Western Kentucky Conference – Bishop William T. McAlilly (Nashville) 
 Virginia Conference – Bishop Sue Haupert-Johnson (Glen Allen) 
 Western North Carolina Conference – Bishop Kenneth H. Carter, Jr. (Huntersville)

South Central Jurisdiction
According to its website , the South Central Jurisdiction consists of the following annual conferences:
 Central Texas Conference—Bishop J. Mike Lowry 
 Great Plains Conference—Bishop Ruben Saenz, Jr. (Kansas/Nebraska) 
 Louisiana Conference—Bishop Cynthia Fierro Harvey (Louisiana Area) 
 Missouri Conference—Bishop Robert Farr (Missouri)  
 Arkansas Conference—Bishop Gary Mueller (Little Rock) 
 New Mexico Conference—Bishop W. Earl Bledsoe (Northwest Texas/New Mexico) 
 North Texas Conference—Bishop Mike McKee (Dallas) 
 Northwest Texas Conference—Bishop W. Earl Bledsoe (Northwest Texas/New Mexico) 
 Oklahoma-Indian Missionary Conference—Bishop James G. Nunn 
 Oklahoma Conference—Bishop James G. Nunn 
 Rio Texas Conference—Bishop Robert Schnase (San Antonio) 
 Texas Conference—Bishop Scott Jones (Houston)  

Note: During its jurisdictional conference in early November 2022, new episcopal appointments were announced which will be effective January 1, 2023:
Louisiana Conference: Bishop Dee J Williamson (newly elected)
Great Plains Conference: Bishop Dr. David Wilson (newly elected)
North/Central Texas Conferences: Bishop Ruben Saenz Jr. (From Great Plains) 
Texas Annual Conference: Bishop Cynthia Fierro-Harvey (From Louisiana)
Arkansas: Bishop Laura Merrill (Newly elected)

Western Jurisdiction
According to its website , the "Western Jurisdiction" of the UMC consists of the following conferences:
 Alaska Conference—Bishop Elaine JW Stanovsky (Seattle) 
 California-Nevada Conference—Bishop Minerva G. Carcaño (Sacramento) 
 California Pacific Conference (UMC) – Bishop Dottie Escobedo-Frank (Pasadena)  
 Desert Southwest Conference—Bishop Robert T. Hoshibata (Phoenix) 
 Mountain Sky Conference—Bishop Karen P. Oliveto (Denver) 
 Oregon-Idaho Annual Conference—Bishop Elaine JW Stanovsky (Seattle) 
 Pacific Northwest Annual Conference—Bishop Elaine JW Stanovsky (Seattle)

Annual conferences in the central conferences (outside the U.S.)
Outside the United States the church is divided into seven central conferences in three continents:
Africa Central Conference
Congo Central Conference
West Africa Central Conference
Central and Southern Europe Central Conference
Germany Central Conference
Northern Europe Central Conference
Philippines Central Conference

Africa Central Conference
Eastern Angola Episcopal Area : Bishop Jose Quipungo
Eastern Angola Annual Conference
East Africa Episcopal Area : Bishop Daniel A. Wandabula
East Africa Annual Conference (includes Burundi, Kenya, Rwanda, Sudan and Uganda)
Mozambique Episcopal Area : Bishop Joaquina Filipe Nhanala
Mozambique North Annual Conference
Mozambique South Annual Conference
South Africa Provisional conference
Western Angola Episcopal Area : Bishop Gaspar João Domingos
Western Angola Annual Conference
Zimbabwe Episcopal Area : Bishop Eben K. Nhiwatiwa
East Zimbabwe Annual Conference
West Zimbabwe Annual Conference

Congo Central Conference
Central Congo Episcopal Area :Bishop David Kekumba Yemba
Central Congo Annual Conference
East Congo Annual Conference (Previously Northeast Congo)
Kasai Provisional Annual Conference
Kivu Provisional Annual Conference
Oriental and Equator Annual Conference (Previously Upper Congo & Equator)
West Congo Annual Conference
North Katanga Episcopal Area : Bishop Nkulu Ntanda Ntambo
North Katanga Annual Conference
Tanganyika/Tanzania Annual Conference
South Congo Episcopal Area : Bishop Kainda Katembo
Lukoshi Annual Conference
North-West Katanga Annual Conference
South Congo Annual Conference
South-West Katanga Annual Conference

West Africa Central Conference
Liberia Episcopal Area: Bishop John Innis
Liberia Annual Conference
Nigeria Episcopal Area Bishop John Wesley Yohanna
Southern Nigeria Annual Conference
Central Nigeria Annual Conference
Northern Nigeria Annual Conference
Sierra Leone Episcopal Area: Bishop John Yambasu
Sierra Leone Annual Conference
Cote d'Ivoire Episcopal Area: Bishop Benjamin Boni
Côte d'Ivoire Annual Conference

Central and Southern Europe Central Conference
Central and Southern Europe Episcopal Area: Bishop Patrick Streiff 
Austria Provisional Annual Conference
Bulgaria Provisional Annual Conference
Czech and Slovak Republics Annual Conference
Hungary Provisional Annual Conference
Poland Annual Conference
Serbia-Montenegro/Republic of Macedonia Provisional Annual Conference
Switzerland-France Annual Conference (includes Algeria District)

Germany Central Conference
Germany Episcopal Area: Bishop Harald Rückert 
Germany East Annual Conference
Germany North Annual Conference
Germany South Annual Conference

Northern Europe Central Conference
Eurasia Episcopal Area: Bishop Eduard Khegay
Central Russia Annual Conference
Eastern Russia and Central Asia Annual Conference
Northwest Russia Provisional Annual Conference
Southern Russia Annual Conference
Ukraine and Moldova Annual Conference
Nordic and Baltic Episcopal Area : Bishop Christian Alsted 
Denmark Annual Conference
Estonia Annual Conference
Finland-Finnish Provisional Annual Conference
Finland-Swedish Provisional Annual Conference
Norway Annual Conference
Sweden Annual Conference

Philippines Central Conference
 Baguio Episcopal Area: Pedro M. Torio Jr.
Central Luzon Philippines Annual Conference
North Central Philippines Annual Conference
Northeast Philippines Annual Conference
Northern Philippines Annual Conference
Northwest Philippines Annual Conference
Pangasinan Philippines Annual Conference
Tarlac Philippines Annual Conference
Northeast Luzon Philippines Annual Conference
 Davao Episcopal Area: Bishop Cery Francisco
East Mindanao Philippines Annual Conference
Mindanao Philippines Annual Conference
Northwest Mindanao Philippines Annual Conference
Southwest Philippines Annual Conference
Palawan Philippines Annual Conference
Visayas Philippines Annual Conference
 Manila Episcopal Area : Bishop Rudy A. Juan
Bicol Philippines Provisional Annual Conference
Bulacan Philippines Annual Conference
Middle Philippines Annual Conference
Philippines Annual Conference
Quezon City Philippines Annual Conference - East
Rizal Philippines Annual Conference - East
Southern Tagalog Provisional Philippines Annual Conference - East
Pampango Philippines Annual Conference
West Middle Philippines Annual Conference

See also

 Conferences of the United Methodist Church
 General Conference (Methodism)
 Jurisdictional Conferences (United Methodist Church)
 Central Conferences (United Methodist Church)
 List of bishops of the United Methodist Church
 Episcopal area (United Methodist Church)

References

The Book of Discipline of the United Methodist Church 2008, ¶¶ 32, 251.2, 601-656.
 Conferences and bishops are from UMC.org Website and are current as of April 2008 or as updated.
 Context for Jurisdictions versus Conferences 

United Methodist Church
Church organization
Conferences
United Methodist Annual Conferences
Dioceses by denomination
Dioceses in the United States